Textbook of Aramaic Documents from Ancient Egypt, often referred to as TAD, is a four volume corpus of Aramaic inscriptions written during the period of ancient Egypt, written by Bezalel Porten and Ada Yardeni.

Originally envisaged to be the Corpus Papyrorum Aramaicarum, following the Corpus Papyrorum Judaicarum, it grew to incorporate all Aramaic inscriptions from the region, not just on papyrus, so the title was changed – this time borrowing from J. C. L. Gibson's 1971 Textbook of Syrian Semitic Inscriptions.

Each of volumes 1-3 contains 40-50 texts (vol. 1 letters (A); vol. 2 contracts (B); vol. 3 literary texts (C)), and volume 4 contains 478 texts, including D1-5: 216 papyrus fragments; D6: 14 leather; D7-10: 87 ostraca. The collection does not include the Saqqarah papyri and most of the Clermont-Ganneau ostraca.

It is the standard reference textbook for the Aramaic Elephantine papyri and ostraca, as well as other examples of Egyptian Aramaic, which together provide the primary extant examples of Imperial Aramaic worldwide.

Concordance

Reviews

Volume 1
 Williamson, H. G. M. (1987). [Review of Textbook of Aramaic Documents from Ancient Egypt 1: Letters, by B. Porten & A. Yardeni]. Vetus Testamentum, 37(4), 493–493. https://doi.org/10.2307/1517566
 Lipiński, E. (1988). [Review of Textbook of Aramaic Documents from Ancient Egypt ('wsp t’wdwt ’rmywt mmşrym h’tyqh), newly copied, edited and translated into Hebrew and English by..., 1. Letters. Appendix: Aramaic Letters from the Bible, by B. Porten & A. Yardeni]. Orientalia, 57(4), 434–436. http://www.jstor.org/stable/43077597
 Kaufman, S. A. (1988). [Review of Textbook of Aramaic Documents from Ancient Egypt. Vol. 1. Letters, by B. Porten & A. Yardeni]. Journal of Near Eastern Studies, 47(4), 289–290. http://www.jstor.org/stable/544888
 Grelot, P. (1988). [Review of Textbook of Aramaic Documents from Ancient Egypt, Newly Copied, Edited and Translated into Hebrew and English, I. Letters. Appendix: Aramaic Letters from the Bible. 34 × 24, by B. Porten & A. Yardeni]. Revue Biblique (1946-), 95(2), 294–299. http://www.jstor.org/stable/44088910

Volume 2
 Lipiński, E. (1990). [Review of Textbook of Aramaic Documents from Ancient Egypt ('wsp t’wdwt ’rmywt mmşrym h’tyqh), newly copied, edited and translated into Hebrew and English by..., 2. Contracts. Vol. 1: text, copies in reduced size (LIV-191 p.); vol. 2: copies (37 foldouts), by B. Porten & A. Yardeni]. Orientalia, 59(4), 552–554. http://www.jstor.org/stable/43075793
 Grelot, P. (1990). [Review of Textbook of Aramaic Documents from Ancient Egypt, by B. Porten & A. Yardeni]. Revue Biblique (1946-), 97(2), 270–276. http://www.jstor.org/stable/44089014
 Segal, J. B. (1992). [Review of Textbook of Aramaic Documents from Ancient Egypt, II, Contracts, by B. Porten & A. Yardeni]. The Journal of Egyptian Archaeology, 78, 344–344. https://doi.org/10.2307/3822102

Volume 3
 Joseph A. Fitzmyer, S. J. (1995). [Review of Textbook of Aramaic Documents from Ancient Egypt, 3: Literature, Accounts, Lists, by B. Porten & A. Yardeni]. Journal of the American Oriental Society, 115(4), 710–711. https://doi.org/10.2307/604758
 Grelot, P., & YARDENI, A. (1996). [Review of Textbook of Aramaic Documents from Ancient Egypt. Literature. Accounts. Lists (Texts and Studies for Students), by B. PORTEN]. Journal for the Study of Judaism in the Persian, Hellenistic, and Roman Period, 27(3), 351–355. http://www.jstor.org/stable/24660077

Volume 4
 Gianto, A. (2000). [Review of Textbook of Aramaic Documents from Ancient Egypt. Newly Copied, Edited and Translated into English. 4: Ostraca and Assorted Inscriptions (Texts and Studies for Students), by B. Porten & A. Yardeni]. Biblica, 81(3), 443–445. http://www.jstor.org/stable/42614297
 Dion, P.-E. (2000). [Review of Textbook of Aramaic Documents from Ancient Egypt. Newly Copied, Edited and Translated into Hebrew and English, Vol. 4: Ostraca and Assorted Inscriptions, by B. Porten & A. Yardeni]. Bulletin of the American Schools of Oriental Research, 318, 77–79. https://doi.org/10.2307/1357731

Work
 Volume 1
 Volume 3
 A Grammar of Egyptian Aramaic

Previous corpuses
 Sayce and Cowley, Aramaic Papyri Discovered at Assuan, (London, 1906)
 Arthur Ungnad, 1911, Aramäische Papyrus aus Elephantine
 Eduard Sachau, 1911, Aramäische Papyrus und Ostraka aus einer jüdischen Militär-Kolonie zu Elephantine
 Text
 Plates
 Arthur Ernest Cowley, 1923, Aramaic papyri of the fifth century B.C
 Noël Aimé-Giron, 1931, Textes araméens d'Égypte

Notes

References

Book series introduced in 1986
1986 non-fiction books
Books about the ancient Near East
Aramaic languages
Inscriptions
Academic literature
Aramaic inscriptions
Aramaic Egyptian papyri